Josef "Sepp" Haider (born 26 September 1953 in Dienten) is a former Austrian rally driver, who won Rally New Zealand in 1988, a round of the World Rally Championship.

Career
After starting out in local rallies, Haider bought an Opel Kadett GT/E and competed in three rallies in the 1977 World Rally Championship season, but retired from all three. In 1987 he was signed by GM Euro Sport for a programme that included three WRC rounds, scoring his first points by finishing 10th on Rallye Sanremo. In 1988 he again did two WRC rounds, winning Rally New Zealand. He did three more WRC events for Opel in 1989, also winning the German championship. In 1993 he did three rounds in an Audi S2 entered by SMS, finishing seventh in Sweden and fifth in Australia, his final WRC event.

WRC victories
{|class="wikitable"
! # 
!Event
!Season
!Co-driver
!Car
|-
|1
| 18th Rothmans Rally of New Zealand
|1988
|Ferdi Hinterleitner
|Opel Kadett GSI
|}

References

External links
Profile at World Rally Archive
Profile at RallyBase

Living people
1953 births
People from Zell am See District
Austrian rally drivers
World Rally Championship drivers
Sportspeople from Salzburg (state)